CR-5000 is Zuken's EDA design suite for electronics systems and printed circuit boards aimed at the enterprise market. It was developed to tackle complex design needs that involve managing the complete development and manufacturing preparation process on an enterprise-wide scale. CR-5000 offers relevant functionality for the design of complex and high-speed boards, addressing design challenges such as signal integrity and electromagnetic compatibility.

CR-5000 is the fourth generation successor of CREATE1000 that was originally developed for PDP-11 by Zukei-Gijutsu-Kenkyusho (Japanese for "Graphic Technology and Research Laboratory"). The main CR-5000 software is developed at Zuken Inc. headquarters in Yokohama, Japan. Other modules are developed in Zuken's EMC Technology Center in Paderborn, Germany which is renowned for its research in EMC and SI simulation tools, and Zuken Technology Center in Bristol, England which focuses on routing tools. The latest version as of June 2012 is CR-5000 version 14.

Tools
Design Gateway: Zuken’s platform for logical circuit design and verification of single and multi-board system-level electronic designs.
CR-5000 Component Manager: Library tool that provides comprehensive parts library management and wizard-generated custom versions of symbols and components.
CR-5000 Constraints Manager: Fully integrated successor to Zuken’s Hot-stage2. Allows the input and management of constraints for multiple domains, eliminating rework and unnecessary prototypes.
CR-5000 Lightning: A virtual prototyping solution for High-Speed PCB design that integrates routing and PCB simulation tools. It provides in-depth analysis and what-if capabilities. EMC and Power integrity options are available.
CR-5000 Graphical Pin Manager: Enables a straightforward FPGA and PCB co-design flow, from top level Hardware description language (HDL) description to schematic symbols, as well as to the physical I/O information for layout.
CR-5000 Board Designer: An enterprise PCB design solution that addresses all aspects of the PCB design process. Has been developed with the core objective of increasing electronic product design quality through advanced editing functionality, collaboration, and verification within the CR-5000 environment and selected third party solutions.
CR-5000 Board Modeler: Optimized for the verification of PCB layouts in their mechanical environment. Provides a 3D view of the PCB in the mechanical enclosure allowing electrical or mechanical engineers to check for conflicts and verify spacing and fit. Supports STEP, ACIS, STL and IDF formats.
CR-5000 DFM Center ADM: Performs manufacturability checking in parallel with the layout process. Integrated with Zuken’s CR-5000 PCB design suite, DFM Center enables direct data transfer from design to manufacturing, saving time and reducing errors.
CR-5000 Board Producer: Expert tool for optimizing manufacturing output. Optimizes silkscreens, soldermasks, stencils, test points, panelization, and more.

See also

 CR-2000
 CR-3000
 CR-8000
 Comparison of EDA software
 List of free electronics circuit simulators
 Zuken
 Cadstar

References

External links
 Official Zuken CR-5000 Website

Electronic design automation software